Joseph-Antoine Raymond (September 22, 1902 – April 18, 1975) was a Canadian politician and a four-term Member of the Legislative Assembly of Quebec.

Background

He was born on September 22, 1902, near Kamouraska, Bas-Saint-Laurent and became a physician.

Mayor

Raymond served as Mayor of Saint-Louis-du-Ha! Ha! from 1947 to 1964.

Member of the legislature

He ran as a Union Nationale candidate in the 1952 election in the provincial district of Témiscouata and won.  He was re-elected in the 1956, 1960 and 1962 elections, but he did not run for re-election in the 1966 election.

Death

Raymond died on April 18, 1975.

References

1902 births
1975 deaths
Mayors of places in Quebec
Union Nationale (Quebec) MNAs
People from Bas-Saint-Laurent